Adolph III may refer to:

 Adolf III of the Marck (1334–1394)
 Adolph III, Count of Waldeck (1362–1431)